Bom Retiro (Korean: 봉헤치로, 봉헤찌로) is a central district in the city of São Paulo, Brazil. It is primarily commercial but has industrial and residential areas.

The district is served by Line 1 (Blue) of the São Paulo Metro and by the lines 7 (Ruby), 10 (Turquoise), and 11 (Coral) of the CPTM.  There is also a planned station for Line 4 (Yellow) of the São Paulo Metro.

Formation 
In the late 19th century and the early 20th century, Bom Retiro was considered to be a modern region. The Luz and the Júlio Prestes railway stations, along with Jardim da Luz, then São Paulo's only public park, were elegant examples of European-influenced Luz Station which was actually built in England while the architecture and landscaping were put together in Brazil.

It was originally an industrial section. In the 1960s, factories began being replaced by active clothing and fashion retail stores and textile and weaving small businesses. The neighborhood had an influx of Mediterranean immigrants such as Italians, Greeks, European Jews and Levantine Arabs from what is now Lebanon and Syria. In greater numbers, the Italians settled in the sections of Bela Vista, Brás, Ipiranga, and Barra Funda and other parts of the state. The Jewish presence was especially felt in the Rua Prates area, with the Renascenca school and college, synagogues, and Kosher stores and restaurants, some of which are still active. After acquiring prosperity from their retail businesses, many Jews migrated to the newer and more affluent sections of Higienopolis, Cerqueira Cesar and Jardins. The Syrian-Lebanese dominated the Rua José Paulino shopping centers as well as the more affluent Paraíso and Vila Mariana neighborhoods near the starting point of the Avenida Paulista new financial center.

Bom Retiro was the entry gate of the immigrant arrivals from the port of Santos, who landed in the city by train via Luz station, or continued their journey towards the coffee plantations in the state interior via the Santos-Jundiai line or shifted to the São Paulo Railway line, later E.F. Sorocabana at Julio Prestes station towards São Paulo State's SW, NW, and Parana' State. Julio Prestes now operates only local trains in the Greater São Paulo region and had some of its halls transformed into the State of the Art Sala Cidade de São Paulo Concert Hall, home to the São Paulo Symphonic Orchestra. Luz Sta. has trains to the Eastern suburb cities of the Greater São Paulo region, such as Santo André, Mogi das Cruzes, Suzano and Poá. In addition, the Jundiaí line still serves that city and the São Paulo's Westside sections suburbs, such as Barra Funda, Lapa, Piqueri, Pirituba, Caieiras, Franco da Rocha, and Francisco Morato. A section of Luz station has been transformed into the interactive Museu da Lingua Portuguesa, the world's only Lusophone—Portuguese language related—museum dedicated in the mid-2000s (decade) with the presence of Portuguese, Brazilian, African and Asian authorities of those countries once ruled by the Portuguese crown. It is an important stop for those who study the language and the field of Linguistics, as well as   anthropology, uses of language, folklore, language development and foreign influences, dialects, poetry, music, origin of names of foods and utensils and other curiosities. The Pinacoteca do Estado de São Paulo, the Museu de Arte Sacra de São Paulo—Sacred Art Museum, with an impressive Brazilian Baroc Art collection and a giant Nativity Scene from Naples, the Pinacoteca Station Art Institute, and the Centre for Music Studies - Tom Jobim are also in the area. The old building of the Polytechnic School of the University of São Paulo now holds the State of São Paulo Technical College and the São Paulo Federal Technical School.

Jardim da Luz is considered the oldest park and one of the few green areas in the central region of São Paulo. Despite its sculptures and grottoes installed and maintained by the Pinacoteca museum next door, it has an intense movement of prostitutes, a few country music singers, as well as itinerant preachers and peddlers. Across from the park through the Luz station in the Old Centro direction, drug activity is not uncommon, which gave the region a bad reputation as the "Cracolandia," or "Crackheadland." Despite the City's attempt to revamp the dilapidated area by demolishing and remodeling buildings and giving incentives to big businesses to settle and build apartment and office buildings there, it is unsafe to stroll along the area, particularly at night, because of rampant crime and other illegal activities. There are entire old buildings invaded by "Sem-Terra" or "Sem-Teto" homeless individuals. With the São Paulo Old Centro Renaissance efforts, a few "noias," or homeless adults and glue-sniffing children have moved toward the Republica and Sé Squares regions. It is wise to visit the attractions of Bom Retiro section within a group of people and during daytime or inquire about bus guided tours. The Luz metro and train stations are well served with police and, after a robbery of important works of art at the Pinacoteca Institute, as well as at the MASP São Paulo Art Museum at avenida Paulista, greater surveillance is being done in the museums.

The Rua José Paulino clothing retail shops and sweatshops, together with the Rua 25 de Março bargain clothing stores near Parque Dom Pedro/Bras have been managed by Koreans and more recently Chinese who employ other Koreans and Latin Americans such as Bolivians. Bom Retiro has now become the second largest Asian stronghold in the city, after the traditional Liberdade Japanese section, which houses the largest Japanese community outside Japan. Koreans are now known to control two thirds of the clothing retail business and their materials travel all over Brazil. Retailers and lovers of budget and yet fashionable articles fly across the country and from African countries as far as Angola and Cape Verde just to shop in this international bargain shopping center.

On 6 January 2010, the São Paulo City Council officially recognised Bom Retiro as being the Korean cultural neighbourhood. On 13 April 2017, São Paulo's mayor João Doria reported during his trip to South Korea, that neighborhood's name Bom Retiro could be altered to Bom Retiro Little Seul, but changed his mind due to negative reactions on public opinion.

Borders 
 North: Tietê River;
 South: Mauá Street/Railway of CPTM (Lines A, D, and E);
 East: Cruzeiro do Sul Avenue and Estado Avenue;
 West: Railway of CPTM (Line B), Engenheiro Orlando Murgel Viaduct, Rudge Avenue, and Casa Verde Bridge (beginning).
 Item de lista com marcadores

Neighboring Districts 
Santana (North);
Pari (East);
Brás (Southeast);
Sé and República (South);
Santa Cecília and Barra Funda (West).

Principal Attractions 
Pinacoteca do Estado de São Paulo;
Luz Station (CPTM);
Museum of the Portuguese Language;
Júlio Prestes Station;
Sala São Paulo;
Pinacoteca Station;
Museu de Arte Sacra;
Igreja de Santo Antônio de Sant'Ana Galvão.

Education
Colégio Polilogos (브라질한국학교), a South Korean international school, is located in Bom Retiro.

Trivia 
The Hospedaria dos Imigrantes ("Immigrants' Inn") was situated in Bom Retiro. It remained there until the 1880s, when it moved to Brás.
Bom Retiro was once a neighborhood where the Italian and Jewish communities predominated. Nowadays, the Korean, and Bolivian presence is very strong.
Sport Club Corinthians Paulista, one of the main soccer teams in São Paulo, was founded by residents of Bom Retiro, in the year of 1910, in Rua José Paulino.
O Ano em Que Meus Pais Saíram de Férias is a film that takes place in 1970 in Bom Retiro. The film is about the 1970 FIFA World Cup and the military dictatorship that took place after the 1964 Brazilian coup d'état. It also shows how strong the central European Jewish and Italian immigrant concentration was (a soccer match between the Italians and the Jews was held in Bom Retiro).

References

External links 
 Compras no Bom Retiro
 History of Bom Retiro

Asian-Brazilian culture in São Paulo
Districts of São Paulo
Korean Brazilian
Tourist attractions in São Paulo